Mobin Mirdoraghi is an Iranian football defender. His brother, Armin, is also a professional footballer.

Club career
Mirdoraghi started his career with Sepahan from youth levels. He moved to Paykan in 2013. In summer 2014 he joined to Saipa and made an appearance in Hazfi Cup. In mid season he joined to Persepolis but failed in making any appearances. In July 2015 he joined to Esteghlal Ahvaz and made his debut against Saba Qom on July 30, 2015. Mirdoraghi moved to Panserraikos of the Greek second-division in February 2017.

Career statistics

References

External links
 Mobin Mirdoraghi at IranLeague.ir

1993 births
Living people
Iranian footballers
Iranian expatriate footballers
Paykan F.C. players
Saipa F.C. players
Persepolis F.C. players
Esteghlal Ahvaz players
Giti Pasand players
Iranian expatriate sportspeople in Greece
Panserraikos F.C. players
Association football fullbacks
People from Andimeshk
Sportspeople from Khuzestan province